Groffliers is a commune in the Pas-de-Calais department in the Hauts-de-France region of France.

Geography
A village situated on the coast at the bay of the Authie, some 8 miles (13 km) southwest of Montreuil-sur-Mer on the D940 road.

Population

Places of interest

 Church of St. Martin, dating from the twelfth century.

See also
Communes of the Pas-de-Calais department

References

Communes of Pas-de-Calais